Harttiella janmoli is a species of catfish in the family Loricariidae. It is native to South America, where it is known only in a small forest creek near Cottica Mountain in French Guiana, at an elevation of 515 m (1690 ft) above sea level. The species reaches 4.7 cm (1.9 inches) in standard length. It was described in 2012 as part of a taxonomic review of members of the loricariid tribe Harttiini native to the Guianas.

References 

Harttiini
Catfish of South America
Fish described in 2012
Loricariidae